

Hans Michahelles (18 May 1899 – 14 June 1975) was a German admiral during World War II. He was a recipient of the Knight's Cross of the Iron Cross of Nazi Germany.

Awards 

 Knight's Cross of the Iron Cross on 30 April 1945 as Konteradmiral and Festungskommandant Girondemündung Nord (Royan)

Notes

References

 

1899 births
1975 deaths
Military personnel from Nuremberg
Imperial German Navy personnel of World War I
Reichsmarine personnel
People from the Kingdom of Bavaria
Recipients of the Knight's Cross of the Iron Cross
German prisoners of war in World War II held by France
Counter admirals of the Kriegsmarine
20th-century Freikorps personnel